The following is a list of Sites of Special Scientific Interest in the Annandale and Eskdale Area of Search.  For other areas, see List of SSSIs by Area of Search.

 Bell's Flow
 Bigholms Burn
 Castle Loch
 Dryfe Water
 Langholm - Newcastleton Hills
 Loch Wood
 Lochmaben Lochs
 Moffat Hills
 Penton Linns
 Perchhall Loch
 Raeburn Flow
 River Esk, Glencartholm
 River Tweed
 Royal Ordnance Powfoot
 Upper Solway Flats and Marshes

 
Annandale and Eskdale